Nyisztor is a Hungarian surname. Notable people with the surname include:

 Alexandru Nyisztor (born 1979), Romanian fencer
 György Nyisztor (1869–1956), Hungarian politician
 János Nyisztor (1887–1924), Hungarian gymnast

Hungarian-language surnames